Villa Alexandria is a former plantation house in the San Marco neighborhood of Jacksonville, Florida. It was built in the 1870s by Hon. Alexander Mitchell and his wife, Martha. In the 1920s, Villa Alexandria's gardens became part of "The Arbors", a residential property.

History
Soon after the Civil War, while visiting Florida, Mrs. Mitchell found a location where health and the pleasures of a home could be combined. A tract of land was purchased on the St. Johns River  from Jacksonville. Here, she and her husband established the vast estate of Alexandria as a winter home. With her indomitable will and energy, aided by ample means, Mitchell in a few years, converted a sandy area into "a thing of beauty and a joy forever." Her home showed good taste and care and was distinguished for hospitality. Constructed in the 1870s, Villa Alexandria was characterized as one of the finest and best kept-up places in Florida.

Grounds

The Mitchell's home was surrounded by broad piazzas. All the out-buildings of every description were well constructed. The grounds were studded with summer-houses and grottos. On the river front, there was a fine pier and boathouse. 

A private road ran from the King's Road to this place. After passing the first gate near the railroad track, another road lead to the second gate, beyond which visitors' carriages were not allowed to pass. This place was generally known as "Craig's Cove". It was part of an old Spanish grant, and was certainly the show place of the environs of Jacksonville.

The grounds contained almost every variety of trees, shrubs and flowers possible to be grown in this climate. Hickory and pecan-trees, English walnut, date and cabbage palms, Chinese and Japanese cane, tea-plant, as well as camelias and roses. There were 2,000 orange trees in full bearing on the premises. Mrs. Mitchell brought to perfection the orange, lemon, banana, olive, plum, pear, peach, and apricot, the English walnut, the pecan from Brazil, and the Spanish chestnut. Among her rare trees were the camphor and cinnamon from Ceylon and the tea plant from China. Her list of bamboos included the sacred tree of India and five varieties of cane. The family of flowers embraced all the well-known varieties of the temperate zone and the tropics.

References

History of Jacksonville, Florida
Houses in Jacksonville, Florida
Plantation houses in Florida